The Corona Bali Protected 2019 was the third event of the Men's Championship Tour in the 2019 World Surf League. It took place from 13 to 25 May in Keramas, Bali, and was contested by 36 surfers.

In the final, Japan's Kanoa Igarashi defeated Jérémy Florès of France to win his first World Surf League event.

Name

When the event was added to the World Surf League calendar in 2018, it was originally to be known as the "Corona Bali Pro", but sponsor Corona renamed the event the "Corona Bali Protected" as part of a campaign to raise awareness of marine plastic pollution.

Format

A new competition format was introduced for the 2019 Championship Tour. All 36 surfers take part in the Seeding Round. The top two surfers in each heat advance directly to the Round of 32, while the lowest-placed surfer in each heat enters the Elimination Round. In each of the four heats in the Elimination Round, the top two surfers advance to the Round of 32, while the lowest-placed surfer is eliminated from the competition. From the Round of 32 onwards, the competition follows a single elimination format, with the winner of each head-to-head heat advancing to the next round and the loser being eliminated.

Competition

The event took place from 13 to 25 May.

Seeding Round

Elimination round

Round of 32

Round of 16

Quarterfinals

Semifinals

Final

References

External links

 World Surf League

2019 World Surf League
Bali Pro
2019 in Indonesian sport
Sport in Bali
May 2019 sports events in Indonesia